Dedovochka is a rural locality (a selo) in Novolimanskoye Rural Settlement, Petropavlovsky District, Voronezh Oblast, Russia. The population was 78 as of 2010.

Geography 
Dedovka is the nearest rural locality.

References 

Rural localities in Petropavlovsky District, Voronezh Oblast